Vytis military district (also Vytis partisan military district) is a military district of Lithuanian partisans which operated in 1944–1953 in the counties of Panevėžys and Ukmergė as well in some parts of the Kėdainiai county. The military district consisted of two territorial detachments (rinktinė) named Briedis and Krištaponis.

Leaders

Structure of Lithuanian partisans' organisation

References

External links
Genocide and Resistance Research Centre of Lithuania
The partisan military districts of the Lithuanian freedom fighters
Vienui Vieni ("Utterly Alone") 2004 film about the Lithuanian Forest Brothers, based on the real life events of Juozas Lukša aka Juozas L. Daumantas
War Chronicle of the Partisans – Chronicle of Lithuanian partisans, June 1944 – May 1949, prepared by Algis Rupainis
«Forest Brothers – Fight for the Baltics» – official YouTube channel of NATO, 2017

Military districts of Lithuanian partisans
Lithuanian partisans
Guerrilla organizations
Cold War rebellions